Carlos Patrick Singleton (born February 15, 1987) is an American football wide receiver who is currently a free agent. He played as a wide receiver for the University of Memphis. He was signed as an undrafted free agent by the Cincinnati Bengals in 2010.

External links
 Memphis Tigers bio 
 Jacksonville Sharks bio 

1987 births
Living people
American football wide receivers
Cincinnati Bengals players
Jacksonville Sharks players
Colorado Crush (IFL) players
Memphis Tigers football players
University of Memphis alumni
People from Brownsville, Tennessee
Players of American football from Tennessee
Tampa Bay Storm players
Florida Tarpons players